The following tables show the England women's national football team's all-time international record. The statistics are composed of FIFA Women's World Cup and UEFA Women's Championship matches, as well as numerous international friendly tournaments and matches.

Following a UEFA recommendation in 1972 for national associations to incorporate the women's game, the Football Association (FA) rescinded its 50-year ban on women playing at English Football League grounds. Shortly after, Eric Worthington was tasked by the Women's Football Association (WFA) to assemble an official women's national team. England competed in its first officially recognised international match against Scotland in Greenock on 18 November 1972, 100 years to the month after the first men's international between the same two nations. England overturned a two-goal deficit to defeat Scotland opponents 3–2, with Sylvia Gore scoring England's first international goal. Prior to this, an English team had played a series of unofficial matches at the 1969 Coppa Europa per Nazioni, and the 1970 and 1971 editions of a "World Championships" held in Italy and Mexico respectively. None of the competitions were sanctioned by FIFA, UEFA, or national associations, and some were contested by club teams acting as de facto national teams.

England have contested 450 matches against 52 different national teams. Of these teams, England have not lost to 30 of them, having earned a perfect 100% winning record against 22 of these teams. West Germany is the only team England has played at least one fixture against and never failed to beat having lost both games against them although England has beaten Germany, the team's successor following the reunification of Germany in 1990.

Performances
Last match updated on 22 February 2023

Performance by competition

Performance by manager

Competition records

FIFA Women's World Cup

UEFA Women's European Championship

Minor tournaments

Head-to-head record 

Last match updated on 22 February 2023

Combined predecessor and successor records

List of FIFA members who have never have played against England

AFC

CAF

CONCACAF

CONMEBOL

OFC

UEFA

Notes

References 

All-time record